North Scarle is a village and civil parish in the North Kesteven district of Lincolnshire, England. The population of the civil parish at the 2011 census was 640.

The parish church is dedicated to All Saints and is a Grade I listed building dating from the 12th century, although it was destroyed by fire in 1342 and rebuilt directly after. In 1898 it was extensively restored and a north aisle was built by Sir Ninian Comper.

The 19th-century clergyman and Australian police commander Henry Inman was rector of All Saints for 36 years and is interred in the churchyard.

Village amenities include a village hall, post office, heritage centre, The White Hart public house, a Methodist hall, a sports and social club and playing fields, and a Primary School.  There is also a miniature railway.

References

External links

North Scarle Primary School
North Scarle Village Website

Villages in Lincolnshire
Civil parishes in Lincolnshire
North Kesteven District